Greenlawn Cemetery was a cemetery located in Indianapolis, Indiana, from 1821 to 1931.

History
Greenlawn Cemetery was established in 1821, as part of the original layout of the city of Indianapolis. It was located along the White River just north of what would later become Kentucky Avenue. Greenlawn was the initial burial place of over 1100 Hoosier pioneers, 1200 Union soldiers and 1600 Confederate prisoners of war. However, the cemetery suffered from vandalism of tombstones, grave robbing, overcrowding, and regular flooding of the White River.

At the time of the American Civil War, Indianapolis had no cemetery specifically designated as a burial place for Union soldiers who died in camps and hospitals near Indianapolis. During the war, when the city served as a major transportation hub and as a camp for Union troops, the soldiers who died at Indianapolis were initially buried at Greenlawn Cemetery. Confederate prisoners who died at Camp Morton, a large prisoner-of-war camp north of Indianapolis, were also interred at Greenlawn. By August 1863 Greenlawn was nearing capacity from wartime casualties and facing encroachment from industrial development. To provide additional land for burials, a group of local businessmen formed a Board of Corporators (trustees) who established Crown Hill Cemetery on October 22, 1863. The privately owned cemetery, northwest of downtown, borders present-day Thirty-Eighth Street. In 1866 the U.S. government authorized a National Cemetery for Indianapolis in Section 10 of Crown Hill and made arrangements for the removal of the soldiers from Greenlawn.

Within a few months the bodies of Union soldiers who were buried at Greenlawn were moved to the National Cemetery. On October 19, 1866, the remains of Matthew Quigley, a former member of Company A, Thirteenth Regiment, became the first of several hundred Union soldiers from Greenlawn to be interred at Crown Hill. By November 1866, the bodies of 707 soldiers had been moved from Greenlawn to Crown Hill.

Closure
Due to its deficiencies, Greenlawn was closed to new burials in 1890, and by 1899 efforts to relocate it entirely were underway. During the relocation process, it was discovered that most of the graves had been robbed at some point, with the bodies being stolen, likely for use as subjects for examination and dissection at area medical schools. Most of the bodies that were present were relocated to Crown Hill Cemetery. In 1931 industrial development around Greenlawn Cemetery required the bodies of the Confederate prisoners to be moved to Crown Hill, where they were interred in a mass grave, known as Confederate Mound, in Section 32 at Crown Hill.

References

Cemeteries in Indiana
Former cemeteries
1821 establishments in Indiana